WCWA (1230 AM) is a radio station licensed to and serving Toledo, Ohio, airing a sports format. Owned by iHeartMedia, it is the Toledo affiliate for Fox Sports Radio, and the city's second-oldest radio station.

History
The station signed on in 1938 as WTOL, founded by former Toledo prosecutor Frazier Reams (whose family would continue to own the station all the way until 1996). Originally licensed for daytime operations only, WTOL was granted authority for around-the-clock operations in 1939 and affiliated with NBC's Blue Network (later to become ABC Radio) shortly thereafter. Programming on WTOL, until the mid-1960s, was a full-service format of news, information, sports, ABC network programs and various types of music, including pop, country, jazz, and, by the early 1960s, some rock and roll. The station started broadcasting 24 hours a day in 1962 with the new format "Demand Radio 123".  The tight format wore out in less than two years. In 1964 WTOL became a personality driven full service facility, and played popular music. For many years, WTOL was a family of three broadcast stations which included TV-11 and FM-104.7.

The call letters were changed in 1965, when the two radio stations split from Channel 11. The call sign "WCWA," or "seaway," was meant to pay tribute to the St. Lawrence Seaway, of which Toledo is a major port (and the seaway itself a major boon to the city's economy. The call sign was originally assigned to a German merchant ship (the MS Karl Trautwein) which gave up the call sign for a modest payment. The easy listening format continued. In 1969, Station Manager Garry Miller persuaded Former WCWA DJ Jim Felton to leave CKLW in Detroit and return to program the station. The new format included PAMS jingles, and a slightly more Top 40 approach, while still avoiding the "harder rock'. The playlist contained the biggest variety of music available, and gained a much larger audience, even topping the ratings of local station WSPD, which remains as a news/talk station, and Detroit stations like WJR and CKLW.  WCWA then went through many format changes in the early 1970s, causing it to be jokingly known as "which way radio".

In the early 1980s, WCWA Manager, Dan Dudley, took the station in another direction with help from consultant Jim Felton, who was working at CFTR in Toronto at the time.
They mixed the oldies with country music cross-over songs. The Urban Cowboy craze was in its heyday, and the fit worked very well. They also brought veteran newsman Don Edwards in to run the news department. Mornings were handled by John Mack Brown, a controversial host, who was counterbalanced by the impressive image of Don Edwards. Deejays were Larry Fletcher, Jay Richards, Larry Weseman and radio legend Don King who hosted Sports Talk every evening. The format did extremely well for about two years, but the "cowboy" fad faded, and WCWA with program director Mike Sheppard, took on another format change, "Nostalgia". The "Music of Your Life" format was making ratings headway across the country as baby boomers began to feel their age. WCWA kept this format in both live and satellite delivered versions until 2002.

The last live version of WCWA in the nostalgia format originated from the Fort Industry Square studios, (designed and maintained by the infamous Denny Moon) from 1997 until 2002. The staff included the legendary Bob Martz, program director Jim Felton, Suzanne Carroll, Bill Charles, Michael Drew (Mike) Shaw, and Dennis Williams. The ratings increased with the live programming, but sales and management claimed they couldn't sell advertising time easily on a station which catered to "old people".

After two decades playing nostalgia/standards, WCWA changed format to talk radio in November 2002. The station's ratings subsequently crashed, and the current sports-talk format was adopted in May 2004; although this change also did nothing to help the station's ratings. The format change away from music also brought much heated protest within the community, specifically from an organization known as CORRAL.

WCWA today
WCWA is owned by iHeartMedia, and is part of that company's Toledo cluster.  WCWA (and its predecessor WTOL) was owned by Frazier Reams for many years prior to radio deregulation in 1996. Other stations in the Toledo cluster are:  WSPD 1370 AM, WVKS 92.5 FM (KISS FM), WRVF 101.5 FM (The River), WCKY-FM 103.7 FM, and WIOT 104.7 FM.

WCWA transmits at a power of 1,000 watts, from studios located atop the Fort Industry Square building on Summit Street in downtown Toledo. The station's advertising offices are located at Superior and Lafayette.  The transmitter is located near the intersection of Hawley & Whittier Streets and can be easily seen from the Anthony Wayne Trail. WCWA also streams its signal and available on the IHeartRadio app

WCWA is the Toledo affiliate of Fox Sports Radio.

On March 1, 2021, WCWA rebranded as "Fox Sports 1230 The Gambler", adding programming from the Vegas Stats & Information Network (VSiN), following in the footsteps of iHeart Fox Sports sister stations in Cleveland, Youngstown, and Philadelphia.

Play by play
WCWA is the flagship station for Toledo Mud Hens baseball, with all regular season games, playoffs and the Triple-A All-Star Game broadcast.  Jim Weber is the play-by-play voice of the Mud Hens, having called the team's games since the mid-1970s.

WCWA is also the flagship of the Toledo Walleye, which played its inaugural season in 2009-2010.  Matt Melzak is the play-by-play announcer for the Walleye. WCWA also carries University of Toledo women's basketball, with Jim Heller calling the plays courtside.

The station also broadcasts Whitmer High School Football and Basketball. Chris Schmidbauer is the play by play voice.

Signal strength
Since 1969, the station engineer at WCWA and WIOT (named Chief Engineer in 1974) has been the legendary Dennis Moon. WCWA was known for having a clearer, fuller sound than most AM stations that offered music programming. This has been attributed by many who have worked there to Moon's decades-long devotion to WCWA's audio quality. The "Moon-unit" updated WCWA to digital HD Radio (IBOC) in the summer of 2007. With just 7 watts of digital power, the station could be received in hybrid digital all the way to the Michigan border.

Specialty shows
WCWA has also featured a large schedule of ethnic and religious programming for most of its history. This includes shows devoted entirely to Polish, German, Mexican, and Irish music, as well as immensely popular Polka, Jazz, and Gospel programs. In addition to these specialty music programs, WCWA is also the home of several spoken-word religious shows covering many different faiths. Some of these religious shows have been on WCWA since its inception. All or most of these programs survived the format switch, and can mainly be heard on weekends.

References

External links
FCC History Cards for WCWA
Fox Sports 1230 The Gambler

CWA
Radio stations established in 1938
IHeartMedia radio stations
Sports radio stations in the United States
Fox Sports Radio stations